Virus is the sixth studio album by British progressive metal band Haken. It was released on 24 July 2020 (postponed three times, first from 5 June 2020, then from 19 June 2020 and finally from 10 July 2020) through Inside Out Music.
According to the band's singer, Ross Jennings, the album is loosely connected to their 2018 release Vector. As well as the latter, Virus was mixed by ex-Periphery bassist Adam "Nolly" Getgood and the artwork was created by long-time collaborators Blacklake. It is the last album featuring keyboardist Diego Tejeida, who left the band the following year.

The first single, "Prosthetic" was released on 3 April 2020, along with a music video.

Background 

Haken had been secretly writing the music for Virus and all the initial ideas were created back when they were writing Vector at the end of 2017. The album title generated surprise as it was announced during the COVID-19 pandemic, but Jennings said it was just coincidental. The singer also remarked that "whilst Virus can absolutely be enjoyed as a stand-alone work, it is thematically and conceptually linked with Vector.
The band comments:

Drummer Ray Hearne adds:

Guitarist Richard Henshall about the production:

Themes 

The themes present in the album are institutional abuse, physical and mentally abusive relationships, anxiety, depression and suicidal tendencies.

Track listing

Reception
The album has received generally positive reviews from music critics. According to critic Thom Jurek it successfully challenges tropes from progressive metal, and lauds the harmonic and rhythmic complexities of the tracks.

Multiple critics also note the musical similarities between the album and the works of bands like Meshuggah and Dream Theater.

Personnel 
Haken
 Ross Jennings – vocals
 Richard Henshall – guitars
 Charlie Griffiths – guitars
 Diego Tejeida – keyboards
 Conner Green – bass
 Raymond Hearne – drums
Additional personnel

 Pete Jones – additional keyboards on "Messiah Complex", drum programming on "The Strain", production and arrangement on "Only Stars"
 Pete Rinaldi – acoustic guitar on "Prosthetic" and "Messiah Complex"
 Adam "Nolly" Getgood – bass solo on "Messiah Complex"

Production and design

 Adam "Nolly" Getgood – mixing, drum engineering
 Anthony Leung – drum engineering
 James Stephenson – drum editing
 Chris McKenzie – assistant vocal engineering
 Ermin Hamidovic – mastering
 Blacklake – art and design
 Corey Meyers – logo
 Jeroen Moons – web design

Charts

References 

2020 albums
Haken (band) albums
Inside Out Music albums
Albums postponed due to the COVID-19 pandemic